Karl Kildal (1 February 1881 – 14 November 1932) was a Norwegian equestrian. He was born in Oslo. He competed at the 1912 Summer Olympics in Stockholm, where he placed 24th in show jumping.

References

1881 births
1932 deaths
Sportspeople from Oslo
Equestrians at the 1912 Summer Olympics
Olympic equestrians of Norway
Norwegian male equestrians